Scott Moak is an American public address announcer best known for his work for the Sacramento Kings of the National Basketball Association. He previously worked for the Kings as Vice President of game entertainment, production and content, as well as Vice President of Community Impact.

Moak has also served as the public address voice of NCAA games at California State University at Sacramento and during the U.S. Track & Field Olympic Trials in Sacramento.

Education
Moak attended John F. Kennedy High School in Sacramento. He also earned an undergraduate degree in psychology from the University of California at Davis.

Career
After graduating from UC Davis, where he worked as a radio announcer, Moak earned a job as a PA announcer for football and basketball games at Kennedy High School where his father worked. 

In 2002, Moak successfully auditioned for the Sacramento Kings to replace their longtime announcer Fred Anderson.

References

External links
 Moak bio at NBA.com
 Moak bio at scottmoak.voice123.com

Living people
Sacramento Kings personnel
National Basketball Association public address announcers
Year of birth missing (living people)
University of California, Davis alumni